Odyssey School is a private middle school in San Mateo, California, a town about  south of San Francisco. Odyssey caters to students in grades 6 through 8. Its five academic core subjects consist of writing, mathematics, science, humanities, and Japanese. Offerings in creative arts include drama, choir, music history, pottery, set design, costume design, and photography. The school also teaches swimming, dance, karate, and stage combat under its movement program.

Odyssey's theater program includes visits to the Oregon Shakespeare Festival in Ashland, Oregon, where students see and study a cross-section of Shakespeare's plays. The school's Japanese program includes hosting Japanese exchange students each autumn, followed by a three-week trip to Japan at the end of eighth grade, in which students stay at temples and Japanese homes.

Odyssey students have won a variety of prizes in outside academic competitions. These include a first place in Notre Dame High School's 2009 Middle Math Contest (out of 190 contestants), and a first place in the 2008 Japanese speech contest of the Japanese Consulate General. Odyssey's programs for helping students cope with stress have attracted regional attention.

Many Odyssey graduates attend college-preparatory schools such as San Francisco University High School, Woodside Priory School, Crystal Springs Uplands School, and Menlo School. Others go on to local public high schools. Odyssey graduates later continue their studies at four-year colleges and universities such as UC-Berkeley, Cornell, Occidental, Reed, and Carnegie Mellon.

Odyssey was founded in 1998.

Odyssey's founding Head of School, Stephen K. Smuin, has been a teacher and school administrator for many years. He had been head of the middle school at the Nueva School, a private elementary and middle school in Hillsborough, California, but was ousted by the school board following allegations of abusive behavior towards a former student. He is the author of three books on writing technique, including "More than Metaphors: Strategies for Teaching Process Writing.". He retired in June 2010.

In July 2010, Daniel Popplewell joined Odyssey as its new Head of School. He had been dean of teaching and learning at Bentley School in Lafayette, California. He was succeeded in July 2013 by Stephen P. Lane, who had been head of Santa Barbara Middle School.

References

External links 
 
 Odyssey School's Facebook page

Education in San Mateo County, California
Educational institutions established in 1998
Private middle schools in California
1998 establishments in California